William à Court, 1st Baron Heytesbury GCB PC (11 July 1779 – 31 May 1860), known as Sir William à Court, 2nd Baronet, from 1817 to 1828, was an English diplomat and Conservative politician.

Background and education
Heytesbury was the eldest son of Sir William à Court, 1st Baronet, and Laetitia, daughter of Henry Wyndham. He was educated at Eton and entered the Diplomatic Service at an early age.

Political and diplomatic career
In 1812 Heytesbury was elected to the House of Commons for Dorchester, a seat he held until 1814. He was also Envoy Extraordinary to the Barbary States from 1813 to 1814, to the Kingdom of Naples in 1814 and to Spain from 1822 to 1824 and served as Ambassador to Portugal between 1824 and 1828.

The latter year Heytesbury was appointed Ambassador to Russia, where he had to deal with the Russo-Turkish War of 1828 to 1829 and the tensions created by the Russian Empire's occupation of the Danubian Principalities. He remained in Russia until 1832. In 1835 Sir Robert Peel nominated him for the office of Governor-General of India, but the Tory government soon fell and he never took up the post. However, he later served under Peel as Lord-Lieutenant of Ireland from 1844 to 1846, and presided over the beginning of the Great Famine (Ireland). Heytesbury succeeded his father as second Baronet in 1817, was admitted to the Privy Council the same year and made a GCB in 1819. In 1828 he was raised to the peerage as Baron Heytesbury, of Heytesbury in the County of Wiltshire.

Family
Lord Heytesbury married Maria Rebecca, daughter of the Hon. William Henry Bouverie, in 1808. They had four sons and two daughters. He died in May 1860, aged 80, and was succeeded in his titles by his eldest son William.

References

 
 Burke's Peerage and Baronetage, 107th edn., (London, 2003)
 Debrett's Peerage (London, 2002)

External links

References

1779 births
1860 deaths
People educated at Eton College
Barons in the Peerage of the United Kingdom
Holmes à Court family
Members of the Parliament of the United Kingdom for English constituencies
Lords Lieutenant of Ireland
Tory MPs (pre-1834)
A Court, William
UK MPs who were granted peerages
Diplomatic peers
Ambassadors of the United Kingdom of Great Britain and Ireland to Spain
Ambassadors of the United Kingdom to Russia
Ambassadors of the United Kingdom to Portugal
Ambassadors to the Kingdom of Naples
Ambassadors of the United Kingdom to the Kingdom of the Two Sicilies
Peers of the United Kingdom created by George IV